The Armstrong Creek Bridge is a truss bridge located in Armstrong Creek, Wisconsin, United States. It was added to the National Register of Historic Places in 2011.

History
The bridge was built on the edge of what would become the Chequamegon-Nicolet National Forest. It was originally part of Highway 101. After the highway was re-routed west of the bridge, it became a footbridge.

References

Road bridges on the National Register of Historic Places in Wisconsin
Truss bridges in the United States
Pedestrian bridges in the United States
Buildings and structures in Forest County, Wisconsin
Bridges completed in 1908
National Register of Historic Places in Forest County, Wisconsin
Former road bridges in the United States
1908 establishments in Wisconsin